The Iraq Liberation Act of 1998 is a United States Congressional statement of policy stating that "It should be the policy of the United States to support efforts to remove the regime headed by Saddam Hussein from power in Iraq." It was signed into law by President Bill Clinton, and states that it is the policy of the United States to support democratic movements within Iraq. The Act was cited in October 2002 to argue for the authorization of military force against Iraq.

The bill was sponsored by Representative Benjamin A. Gilman (Republican, NY-20) and co-sponsored by Representative Christopher Cox (Republican, CA-47). The House of Representatives passed the bill 360–38 on October 5, and the Senate passed it with unanimous consent two days later. President Clinton signed the Iraq Liberation Act into law on October 31, 1998.

Findings and declaration of policy
The Act found that between 1980 and 1998 Iraq had:
 committed various and significant violations of international law,
 failed to comply with the obligations to which it had agreed following the Gulf War and
further had ignored resolutions of the United Nations Security Council.
The Act declared that it was the Policy of the United States to support "regime change." The Act was passed 360–38 in the U.S. House of Representatives and by unanimous consent in the Senate. US President Bill Clinton signed the bill into law on October 31, 1998. The law's stated purpose was: "to establish a program to support a transition to democracy in Iraq." Specifically, Congress made findings of past Iraqi military actions in violation of International Law and that Iraq had denied entry of  United Nations Special Commission on Iraq (UNSCOM) inspectors into its country to inspect for weapons of mass destruction. Congress found: "It should be the policy of the United States to support efforts to remove the regime headed by Saddam Hussein from power in Iraq and to promote the emergence of a democratic government to replace that regime." On December 16, 1998, President Bill Clinton mandated Operation Desert Fox, a major four-day bombing campaign on Iraqi targets.

President Clinton stated in February 1998:

Support for groups opposed to Hussein
This act required the President to designate one or more qualified recipients of assistance, with the primary requirement being opposition to the present Saddam Hussein regime. Such groups should, according to the Act, include a broad spectrum of Iraqi individuals, groups, or both, who are opposed to the Saddam Hussein regime, and are committed to democratic values, peaceful relations with Iraq's neighbors, respect for human rights, maintaining Iraq's territorial integrity, and fostering cooperation among democratic opponents of the Saddam Hussein regime. On February 4, 1999 President Clinton designated seven groups as qualifying for assistance under the Act. (see Note to 22 U.S.C. 2151 and 64 Fed. Reg. 67810). The groups were 
 The Iraqi National Accord,
 The Iraqi National Congress,
The Islamic Movement of Iraqi Kurdistan,
The Kurdistan Democratic Party,
 The Movement for Constitutional Monarchy,
 The Patriotic Union of Kurdistan, and
 The Islamic Supreme Council of Iraq.

The Act authorized the President to assist all such groups with: broadcasting assistance (for radio and television broadcasting), military assistance (training and equipment), and humanitarian assistance (for individuals fleeing Saddam Hussein). The Act specifically refused to grant the President authority to use U.S. Military force to achieve its stated goals and purposes, except as authorized under the Act in section 4(a)(2)) in carrying out this Act.

In  November 1998 President Clinton stated that "The evidence is overwhelming that such changes will not happen under the current Iraq leadership."

Contemplation of post-Hussein Iraq
The Act contemplated the future need for war crimes tribunals in Iraq stating, "The Congress urges the President to call upon the United Nations to establish an international criminal tribunal for the purpose of indicting, prosecuting, and imprisoning Saddam Hussein and other Iraqi officials who are responsible for crimes against humanity, genocide, and other criminal violations of international law."

A generalized statement of policy toward the post-Hussein Iraq was also set forth stating,

It is the sense of the Congress that once the Saddam Hussein regime is removed from power in Iraq, the United States should support Iraq's transition to democracy by providing immediate and substantial humanitarian assistance to the Iraqi people, by providing democracy transition assistance to Iraqi parties and movements with democratic goals, and by convening Iraq's foreign creditors to develop a multilateral response to Iraq's foreign debt incurred by Saddam Hussein's regime.

Precursor to war
President George W. Bush, who followed Clinton, often referred to the Iraq Liberation Act and its findings to argue that the Clinton administration supported regime change in Iraq – and, further, that it believed Iraq was developing weapons of mass destruction. The Act was cited as a basis of support in the Congressional Authorization for Use of Military Force Against Iraq in October 2002.

References

External links
 , Original text of act
 

United States foreign relations legislation
Iraq–United States relations
Acts of the 105th United States Congress
1998 in international relations